Charles William Spencer (4 December 1899 – 9 February 1953) was an English footballer and manager.

Club career
After service with the Royal Engineers during the First World War, Spencer joined Newcastle United from non-league football in October 1921. He played for the club until 1928, making a total of 175 appearances and scored one goal.

In January 1928, Spencer signed for Manchester United, and was given the captaincy upon his arrival. However, he was only there for 18 months, leaving the club for Tunbridge Wells Rangers in 1929, to become a player-coach at the Kent-based side. He then moved to Wigan Athletic, where he became the club's first ever manager.

International career
Spencer played twice for England. His first game was against Scotland on 12 April 1924 and his second, and last, cap came against Wales on 28 February 1925.

Managerial career
Spencer became Wigan Athletic's first ever manager in August 1932. During his first four seasons at the club, he won the Cheshire County League Championship three times.

He left Wigan in March 1937 to become manager of Grimsby Town. Grimsby were then playing in the First Division and narrowly avoided relegation at the end of the 1937–38 season.

The following season, Spencer had assembled a fine squad, including former Liverpool centre forward Fred Howe, Jimmy Boyd (who had won the FA Cup with Newcastle United in 1932) and Tommy Jones from Blackpool. Grimsby performed far better in the league, finishing in tenth place in the table, whilst in the FA Cup, they reached the semi-final against Wolverhampton Wanderers, having defeated fellow First Division team Chelsea in the previous round. The semi-final was played at Old Trafford on 25 March 1939 in front of a crowd of 76,962 spectators; this remains the record attendance at Old Trafford. In the semi-final, Grimsby were no match for Wolves and were "simply swept aside", going down 5–0.

He was appointed as manager of York City in November 1952. However, he died less than three months into his reign at the club on 9 February 1953 at his home in Blackpool.

Managerial stats

References

External links

1899 births
People from Washington, Tyne and Wear
Footballers from Tyne and Wear
1953 deaths
English footballers
England international footballers
Association football defenders
Newcastle United F.C. players
Manchester United F.C. players
Tunbridge Wells F.C. players
English Football League players
English football managers
Wigan Athletic F.C. managers
Grimsby Town F.C. managers
York City F.C. managers
Hastings United F.C. (1948) managers
English Football League managers
English Football League representative players
British Army personnel of World War I
Royal Engineers soldiers
FA Cup Final players